Updegraff may refer to:

Places
 Updegraff, Iowa, an unincorporated community in Clayton County, Iowa, United States.

People
 Stephen Updegraff, an American refractive surgeon
 Jonathan T. Updegraff, a U.S. Representative from Ohio
 Ed Updegraff, an American amateur golfer and urologist
 Allan Eugene Updegraff, an American-born novelist, poet, and editor
 Thomas Updegraff, an attorney and five-term Republican member of the U.S. House of Representatives from northeastern Iowa

Court Case
 Wieman v. Updegraff, a ruling by the United States Supreme Court